Babai is a town in the Jhunjhunu district of the state of Rajasthan, India. It is located in the foothills of the Arawali mountain range at 420 meters above sea level. It has a fort with a moat surrounding it,

The town has a population of 10,000. The population speaks Hindi and Rajasthani.

References

Villages in Jhunjhunu district